Olha Leonova (born 27 June 1976) is a Ukrainian diver. She competed in the women's 10 metre platform event at the 2004 Summer Olympics.

References

1976 births
Living people
Ukrainian female divers
Olympic divers of Ukraine
Divers at the 2004 Summer Olympics
Place of birth missing (living people)